Horses & Trees is an album by English drummer Ginger Baker, released in 1986. The album is entirely instrumental and contains six dance-oriented songs.

Track listing 
 "Interlock"  (Bill Laswell, Daniel Ponce, Nicky Skopelitis, Foday Musa Suso) -4:55
 "Dust To Dust"  (Laswell) -5:29
 "Satou"  (Laswell, Suso, Aïyb Dieng) -5:20
 "Uncut"  (Laswell, Ponce, Skopelitis, Suso, Ginger Baker) -6:48
 "Mountain Time"  (Baker, Dieng) -6:04
 "Makuta"  (Baker, Dieng, Laswell, Suso) -5:34

Personnel 
Ginger Baker - drums, percussion, tympani, gong, congas, maracas
Nicky Skopelitis - guitars
Bill Laswell - bass guitars, slide guitar
Bernie Worrell - organ, keyboards
Robert Musso - piano, organ
Lakshminarayana Shankar - violin
Daniel Ponce - percussion, bata, bells
Foday Musa Suso - percussion, kalimba,  dousongonni, nyanyer, kora
Naná Vasconcelos - drums, berimbau, cuica, voice, shaker
Grandmixer D.ST - turntable
Aïyb Dieng - drums, percussion, chatan, bells

References

1986 albums
Albums produced by Bill Laswell
Ginger Baker albums
Celluloid Records albums